The Work and the Glory is a 2004 historical fiction drama film directed by Russell Holt and starring Sam Hennings, Brenda Strong, Eric Johnson, Alexander Carroll, Tiffany Dupont, and Jonathan Scarfe. It tells the story of the fictional Steed family in the 1820s and their struggles trying to adopt the new Mormon religion, and it explores their relationship with their community, with its founder, Joseph Smith and the rest of the Smith family.

This movie is based on the first novel, The Work and the Glory: Pillar of Light by Gerald N. Lund in the nine-part The Work and the Glory series.

Reception

On Rotten Tomatoes the film has an approval rating of 17% based on reviews from 12 critics.

Sequels
The film was followed by two sequels, The Work and the Glory: American Zion released in 2005, and The Work and the Glory III: A House Divided released in 2006.

References

External links
 
 See the Filming and Cast
 
 

2004 films
Films based on American novels
Mormon cinema
Films set in New York (state)
American historical drama films
2000s historical drama films
Films scored by Sam Cardon
2004 drama films
2000s English-language films
2000s American films